Jimmy Montgomery BEM (born 9 October 1943) is an English retired footballer who played as a goalkeeper. He made a record 627 appearances for his hometown club Sunderland with 537 of these appearances being in the league, after joining the club as a youngster in 1960.

In June 2015, Montgomery was awarded the British Empire Medal for his services to football in the Queen's birthday honours list.

Football career
He made his debut aged only 18 against Walsall, going on to serve 17 years at the club.

Montgomery featured for Sunderland in the 1973 FA Cup Final, where they beat Leeds United 1–0 to win the FA Cup for only the second time in their history. His most memorable contribution in that match was a double save from Trevor Cherry and Peter Lorimer which prevented Leeds from equalising. This was described in an internet article in 2012 as the greatest double save ever.

Montgomery also played for Southampton, Birmingham City and Nottingham Forest. After he retired as a player Montgomery returned to Birmingham City  and Sunderland as a goalkeeping coach.

Personal life
He is related to James Montgomery, also a footballer.

In October 2020, a mural of Montgomery celebrating the 1973 Sunderland FA Cup win was unveiled on The Times Inn public house overlooking the River Wear at Wear Street, Sunderland.

Honours

Club
Sunderland
 FA Cup: 1972–73
 Football League Division Two: 1975–76

Nottingham Forest
 European Cup: 1979–80

Individual
PFA Division Two Team of the Year: 1975–76
British Empire Medal: 2015

References

1943 births
Living people
Footballers from Sunderland
English footballers
England under-23 international footballers
Sunderland A.F.C. players
Southampton F.C. players
Birmingham City F.C. players
Nottingham Forest F.C. players
Association football goalkeepers
United Soccer Association players
English Football League players
Vancouver Royals players
Recipients of the British Empire Medal
English expatriate sportspeople in Canada
Expatriate soccer players in Canada
English expatriate footballers
FA Cup Final players